José Aniceto Clarín y Butalid (December 12, 1879 – June 2, 1935) was a Filipino politician who served as the 3rd president pro tempore of the Senate of the Philippines from 1934 until his death in 1935.

Clarín was born on December 12, 1879, to Don Aniceto Velez Clarín, first civil governor of the province of Bohol. Clarín was educated at the University of San Carlos in Cebu primary education and then in Escuela de Derecho de Manila for his law degree earned in 1904.

See also
 List of Philippine legislators who died in office

References
 
 

1879 births
1935 deaths
20th-century Filipino politicians
Presidents pro tempore of the Senate of the Philippines
University of San Carlos alumni
People from Tagbilaran
Senators of the 10th Philippine Legislature
Senators of the 9th Philippine Legislature
Senators of the 8th Philippine Legislature
Senators of the 7th Philippine Legislature
Senators of the 6th Philippine Legislature
Senators of the 5th Philippine Legislature
Senators of the 4th Philippine Legislature
Members of the House of Representatives of the Philippines from Bohol